Occupy may refer to:
  Occupy (book), a 2012 short study of the Occupy movement by Noam Chomsky
 Occupy movement, an international protest that began in New York

See also
 
 Occupancy, a piece of property used to shelter something
 Occupation (disambiguation), various meanings